CBC Saskatchewan may refer to:

 CBC Regina (disambiguation)
 CBC Saskatoon (disambiguation)